Police General Pao Sarasin (c. 1929 – March 7, 2013) was a Thai politician and former police officer. Sarasin served as the Deputy Prime Minister of Thailand, as well as the country's Interior Minister, in 1992.

Early life and education
Pao Sarasin was the son of former Prime Minister of Thailand Pote Sarasin and his wife, Thanpuying Siri Sarasin. He was one of three brothers, including Pong Sarasin and Arsa Sarasin. Pao Sarasin graduated from Vajiravudh College, a boarding school in Bangkok. He then moved to the United States, where he received a bachelor's degree in chemistry from Johns Hopkins University and a second bachelor's degree from the University of California in criminology.

Careers
Sarasin enlisted the Royal Police Thai in 1954, rising to the rank of police general during his career. He served as the Chief of the force's Office of the Narcotics Control Board from 1978 until 1983. In 1987, he became the Chief of the Royal Thai Police.

In 1992, Sarasin briefly held the posts of Deputy Prime Minister and Interior Minister under the Royal Thai Army military junta and the post-coup government of former Prime Minister Anand Panyarachun.

During his later life, Sarasin served as the council presidents of both Mae Fah Luang University in Chiang Rai province and Khon Kaen University in Khon Kaen province.

Death
Pao Sarasin died at Siriraj Hospital in Bangkok after a month-long hospitalization for a blood infection on March 7, 2013, at the age of 83. A royal bathing rite ceremony for Sarasin was held at the Wat Benchamabophit with Princess Maha Chakri Sirindhorn in attendance representing the royal family. He was survived by his wife, Thapuying Tawika Sarasin, and three sons, including Thai television host, Kanit Sarasin.

Honours

Foreign honours
  : Honorary Commander of the Order of Loyalty to the Crown of Malaysia (P.S.M.) (1988)
  : Honorary Commander of the Order of the Defender of the Realm (P.M.N.) (1993)

See also
Sarasin family

References

|-

2013 deaths
Pao Sarasin
Pao Sarasin
Hainanese people
Pao Sarasin
Johns Hopkins University alumni
University of California, Berkeley alumni
Pao Sarasin
Year of birth uncertain
Pao Sarasin
Honorary Commanders of the Order of Loyalty to the Crown of Malaysia
1929 births